Picture Perfect Hair Salon (known as Hair Salon in Europe) is a video game developed by Sonic Powered Co. Ltd and released by 505 Games on November 13, 2009 in Europe and November 23, 2009 in the United States for the Nintendo DSi.

Gameplay
The game utilizes the Nintendo DSi console's camera feature to be able to recognize and take pictures of the player's face to allow them to customize their hair in the game.

References

2009 video games
Nintendo DSi games
Nintendo DS-only games
Nintendo DS games
Nintendo Wi-Fi Connection games
Video games developed in Italy
Multiplayer and single-player video games
505 Games games